Internatet was a Norwegian reality TV series that aired on TVNorge.

The premiere was on 14 September 2005 and has aired 1 season.

Plot
20 boys and girls in their teens live like teens did in 1955. The teens live several weeks at a boarding school and live under the rules they had in the 1950s.

Ratings
The first season of Internatet had close to 400 000,viewers.

External links
- Internatet var bortkastet (Norwegian)
TVNorge vil ha mer internatet (Norwegian)
TVNorge begynner feriekoloni (Norwegian)

References

TVNorge original programming
Norwegian reality television series
2005 Norwegian television series debuts
2005 Norwegian television series endings
2000s Norwegian television series